Mbong Amata  (born 21 September 1985)  is a Nigerian actress. She has acted in films such as Black November, Forgetting June,  and Inale. She won the "Most Beautiful Girl" (Akwa Ibom) in 2003, and was the 2nd runner up in the 2004 Miss Nigeria.

Personal life
In 2001, at an audition in Calabar, she met Jeta Amata.  Two years later when she was 18 they began dating.  They married in 2008 and their daughter Veno was born later that year.  In 2013 they separated and in 2014 they divorced.

Amata lives between Los Angeles and Lagos. people thought she went missing, she later came out to debunk the news on social media.

Filmography

See also
 List of Nigerian actors

References

Living people
Nigerian film actresses
Miss Nigeria delegates
Nigerian models
Beauty pageant contestants
Nigerian female models
1985 births